National Highway 419, commonly called NH 419 is a national highway in  India. It is a spur road of National Highway 19. NH-419 traverses the states of Jharkhand and West Bengal in India.

Route 
Kulti, Chittaranjan, Jamtara, Gobindpur

Junctions  
 
  Terminal near Kulti.
  Terminal near Gobindpur.

See also 
 List of National Highways in India
 List of National Highways in India by state

References

External links 

 NH 419 on OpenStreetMap

National highways in India
National Highways in Jharkhand
National Highways in West Bengal